Rodolfo Kappenberger (6 October 1917 – 11 May 2012) was a Swiss international footballer.

Kappenberger was born in Lugano. He played for SC Zug, FC Lugano and seven years for FC Basel. He also played six games for the Swiss national football team in which he scored five goals, two of them in the 2:1 away win on 1 February 1942 against Germany in the Praterstadion in Vienna.  He died in Magliaso.

Honours and Titles 
 Swiss Cup winner: 1947
 Promotion to Nationalliga A: 1946

Sources and References 

1917 births
2012 deaths
Swiss men's footballers
Switzerland international footballers
Association football forwards
FC Basel players
FC Lugano players
Sportspeople from Lugano